Super League Triathlon is a league of nonstandard triathlon-based races held in the traditional off-season of the sport. Every race involves a swim, bike and run element but all contain additional rules in an aim to test athletic ability, increase viewer excitement and increase the popularity of triathlon more globally.

Structure
The league's season lasts from around September to April. Over the course of the season, Rounds are held at locations around the world; a Round will normally cover a weekend with multiple races occurring for both the men's and women's competition.

Contracts
Being a closed league, only athletes who have a contract with the league for the current season may compete, most athletes that are considered to be the current best in the world are invited to sign contracts with additional contracts  won in preseason qualifier events and others awarded to local athletes. The current split is the top ten from the previous season are awarded contracts with ten more split between the best placed at the two qualifying events and the final five being wild card invites currently favouring young or local athletes. This gives a total of 25 athletes for both the men's and women's competitions.

Jerseys
All athletes wear the same yellow jersey with the leagues sponsorship on it, however there is also space for personal or national sponsors. Each jersey is adorned with the athletes national flag for men on the left shoulder and for women on the side panelling under both arms. Special coloured jerseys are awarded to athletes to distinguish them, and each colour has a specific meaning:

 blue-fastest swim split from the previous round
 green-fastest bike split from the previous round
 red-fastest run split from the previous round
 white-athletes under 21
 pink-overall points lead

A jersey of each colour is awarded to the relevant men and women before the start of the next round, except the white jersey which is awarded to all of the athletes under 21.

The women's jerseys are currently a more revealing design than that of the men. This continues to draw criticism from female triathlon participants across the sport with regards to objectification of female athletes and safety/health implications of a lack of breast tissue support and skin cancer risk, due to their open back design. Coloured jerseys, for discipline leaders, were discontinued in 2021, along with the introduction of teams, however discipline and team leader boards, along with the overall series title, are still contested.

Points 
During every Round each race awards points towards an athlete's Round score then at the end of a Round athletes are ranked based on their total Round points and awarded League points based on placement, the athlete with the most League points at the end of the season is crowned the overall winner. Point distributions for Round and League points are the same using the following spread.

Any athlete that gets pulled from a race due to a time cut will have Round points removed, if they are pulled in the first stage of a race the lose two points if they are pulled during the second stage they lose one point and if they are pulled in the third stage they are awarded 0 points for that race.

Championship Series Races
Super league triathlon was created with the aim of testing athletes abilities in each discipline of a triathlon (swim, bike, run) but not in the usual way. To do this the league consists exclusively of races that do not follow this convention. Each race is designed to test different aspects of an athlete's ability and racing nous. All races are based on short loops; this leads to fast and aggressive styles of racing. This also means that the race can be based in a city, giving easy access for spectators and allowing spectators to repeatedly see athletes pass, while causing minimal inconvenience to the host.

At every location a short loop for each race element (swim, bike and run) is set around a central transition area, then each race will use those loops but in different variations depending on the race.

The current five race formats are:
Triple Mix- Three short triathlons are raced but in each triathlon the order of the disciplines is changed: the first is a traditional swim-bike-run; the second is a run-bike-swim; and the third is a bike-swim-run, with a ten minute break between each stage to rest and reset their equipment ready for the next one. The first two stages are mass starts with the third being a pursuit with start times based on the sum of the previous two meaning the first over the line of third stage wins the Triple Mix.
Eliminator -Three short triathlons are raced but at the end of each triathlon the slowest are removed and do not start the next stage. After the first stage the 15 fastest race again then the top ten from the second stage advance to the third stage where the order over the line is the given order of the Eliminator.
Enduro  - Three short triathlons are concatenated into one long swim-bike-run-swim-bike-run-swim-bike-run race with the added punishment that last two into transition after each discipline are eliminated.
Sprint Enduro - The field is split in two by random draw, each half races a short triathlon with the first five from each half advancing along with the two fastest finishers not to automatically qualify. Those who advance race a shorter enduro race consisting of two short triathlons i.e. a swim-bike-run-swim-bike-run race.
Equalizer - A two-stage race comprising an individual cycling time trial in for the first stage then the second stage a swim-run-swim-bike-run is raced with the stage started pursuit style with the time gaps from the previous time trial.

Also if an athlete is at any point 90 seconds down from first place they are pulled from the event. This is to keep the focus of the race at the front and to avoid athletes getting lapped and interfering with the race due to the short loops used for the course.

In all instances the swim is open-water and the cycling will be draft-legal.

Team Era Champions

Men's Champions

Women's Champions

2022 Championship Season

Teams 
The SLT Teams returned for the 2022 Season, with the new additions of Bahrain Victorious as a sponsor for Team Scorpions and the Fan Team Cheetahs. The Fan Team concept allows fans to pay a subscription and become a 'Fan Team Owner'. Fan Team owners then get the opportunity to vote on key strategic decisions within the Championship Series such as who will take any Short Chutes that the Cheetahs win, or where the Cheetahs will line up on the start pontoon. The Cheetahs are still coached by Annie Emmerson, as well as the Fan Team decisions. 

The teams for the 2022 season are: 

Fan Team Cheetahs, Coached by Annie Emmerson: Sophie Coldwell, Miriam Casillas Garcia, Rachel Klamer, Verena Steinhauser, Jonny Brownlee, Marten Van Riel, Max Stapley, Shachar Sagiv 

Team SLT Rhinos, Coached by Ronnie Schildknecht: Taylor Spivey, Natalie Van Coevorden, Jeanne Lehair, Hanne De Vet, Vasco Vilaca, Sergio Baxter Cabrera, Joao Silva, Valentin Wernz

Team SLT Eagles, Coached by Tim Don: Non Stanford, Sian Rainsley, Sara Roel, Sophia Green, Matthew Hauser, Jamie Riddle, Emil Holm, Dan Dixon

Team SLT Sharks, Coached by Michelle Dillon: Beth Potter, Kate Waugh, Nicole Van Der Kaay, Jule Behrens, Hayden Wilde, Tayler Reid, Chase McQueen, Panagiotis Bitados 

Bahrain Victorious Scorpions, Coached by Chris McCormack: Cassandre Beaugrand, Georgia Taylor Brown, Cathia Schar, Emma Jeffcoat, Vincent Luis, Tyler Mislawchuk, Kenji Nener, Christopher Perham 

2022 Wildcards and Replacements: Richard Murray (Cheetahs), Ryan Fisher (Scorpions), Alex Yee (Rhinos), Laura Lindermann (Cheetahs/ Rhinos), Cameron Wurf (Scorpions), Jessica Fullagar (Scorpions), Davis Bove (Sharks), Summer Rappaport (Cheetahs/ Eagles), Gina Sereno (Cheetahs) Maxamilion Sperl (Rhinos), Donian Coninx (Eagles), Nathan Lessmann (Scorpions)

Results

Men's results 

Races and overall

The winner of each event takes home $20,000, while the Championship Series winners is awarded a further $50,000. The winning Team will share $120,000 between them.

 Discipline winners
Jerseys (blue for swim, green for bike, red for run) and separate cash prizes were also awarded to the best triathletes in each of the three disciplines that make up triathlon, echoing the secondary classification prizes in road cycling. 

Each winner received $15,000.

Women's results 

Race and overall results

 Discpline winners
Jerseys (blue for swim, green for bike, red for run) and separate cash prizes were also awarded to the best triathletes in each of the three disciplines that make up triathlon, echoing the secondary classification prizes in road cycling. 

Each winner received $15,000.

Team results

The winning Team share $120,000 between them.

2021 Championship Season

Teams

Before the 2021 season, it was announced that for the first time Super League Triathlon athletes would be competing as representatives of teams as well as individually. Each team would be picked and coached by a triathlon legend. Following the draft on 26th August 2021, the teams for the 2021 season were as follows:

Cheetahs, coached by Annie Emmerson: Sophie Coldwell, Maya Kingma, Léonie Périault, Anna Godoy, Jonny Brownlee, Tyler Mislawchuk, Tamas Toth, Aaron Royle

Rhinos, coached by Ronnie Schildknecht: Katie Zaferes, Rachel Klamer, Yuko Takahashi, Valerie Barthelemy, Marten Van Riel, Jacob Birtwhistle, Jannik Schaufler, Kenji Nener

Eagles, coached by Tim Don: Jess Learmonth, Taylor Spivey, Vicky Holland, Vittoria Lopes, Alex Yee, Jelle Geens, Max Studer, Marco van der Stel

Sharks, coached by Michelle Dillon: Beth Potter, Non Stanford, Carolina Routier, Simone Ackermann, Hayden Wilde, Jonas Schomburg, Vasco Vilaça, Tayler Reid

Scorpions, coached by Chris McCormack: Cassandre Beaugrand, Georgia Taylor-Brown, Ilaria Zane, Emilie Morier, Vincent Luis, Matthew Hauser, Mario Mola, Shachar Sagiv

Results

Men's results

 Discpline winners
Jerseys (blue for swim, green for bike, red for run) and separate cash prizes were also awarded to the best triathletes in each of the three disciplines that make up triathlon, echoing the secondary classification prizes in road cycling. 

Each winner received $15,000.

Women's results

 Discpline winners
Jerseys (blue for swim, green for bike, red for run) and separate cash prizes were also awarded to the best triathletes in each of the three disciplines that make up triathlon, echoing the secondary classification prizes in road cycling. 

Each winner received $15,000.

Rankings

Men's Rankings

  This athlete was the Run winner, meaning they accrued the most points during the Run legs across the season
  This athlete was the Swim winner, meaning they accrued the most points during the Swim legs across the season
  This athlete was the Bike winner, meaning they accrued the most points during the Bike legs across the season
  This athlete only competed in London, after being given a wildcard
  This athlete only competed in Munich, after being given a wildcard
  This athlete only competed in Jersey, after being given a wildcard
  This athlete only competed in Malibu, after being given a wildcard

Women's Rankings

  This athlete was the Run winner, meaning they accrued the most points during the Run legs across the season
  This athlete was the Bike winner, meaning they accrued the most points during the Bike legs across the season
  This athlete was the Swim winner, meaning they accrued the most points during the Swim legs across the season
  This athlete only competed in London, after being given a wildcard
  This athlete only competed in Munich, after being given a wildcard
  This athlete only competed in Malibu, after being given a wildcard

Team Rankings

2018–2019 Championship Series Season

Results

Men's results

Women's results

2017 
The 2017 season consisted of a test event that was held on Hamilton Island, Australia in order to gauge popularity as well as test many of the unique factors about super league i.e the unique race formats). After the success of the test event, another event now also hosting a woman's competition was held on Jersey; this event refined many of the original ideas and allowed for further testing.

Announcement 
Although it had been a somewhat open secret in the triathlon media, on 10 February Super league triathlon was officially announced and its website launched. During the announcement one of the founders Chris McCormack declared it to be the future of triathlon with 25 of the best professional men competing in action-packed, innovative race formats competing for 200,000 US dollars. It was stated that although this was a test event there were already plans to include an equal woman's event as well as age group races and a total prize purse of 1.5 million US dollars. The series was to be broadcast on television locally by Australia's Fox Sports and in Europe by Eurosport the series also stated that the races would be available to stream live on their own website.

Invited athletes

Championship Series Hosts

Super league locations

Arena Games Triathlon

Arena Games Triathlon Race Format 
Arena Games Triathlon* is a form of Super League Triathlon that blends real life racing and virtual racing. The swim portions of the race take place in an Olympic standard pool, while the bike and run sections take place on the pool deck or pool's surrounding area, utilizing static bikes and self propelled treadmills. The bike and run sections of the race are then brought to life by use of in-your-face cameras, capturing the athlete's reactions and emotions as the race unfolds, and through utilizing the training platform Zwift. This includes athletes each having their own race avatar (so that spectators can see the athlete's positions, in relation to each other, on the route selected on Zwift) and real time displays of power output and heartrate data. 

At the Arena Games Triathlon, each swim is 200 m, each bike is 4 km, and each run is 1 km. AGT events are competed over heats and a final. Heats see two stages of swim-bike-run, which determine which athletes proceed to the final. 10 athletes qualify for each event final. The final in competed of a over AGT race format. This means 3 back to back stages of swim, bike, run with minimal rest between each stage. A pursuit style start is adopted for the final stage, and the second stage takes the form reversed triathlon (run, bike, swim).

*Arena Games Triathlon not included as part of the Championship Series. As of 2022 Arena Games Triathlon events will form the Arena Games Triathlon World Championship Series powered by Zwift. Points from the series will also contribute points to the World Triathlon rankings.

2020 season 
The Super League Triathlon (SLT) Arena Games was developed as a way of blending virtual and real life racing to create the ultimate spectator experience. The Arena Games debuted in 2020, and provided a way for live professional triathlon to continue, behind closed doors, throughout the global COVID-19 pandemic. The inaugural Arena Games event was held in Rotterdam on 23 August 2020. The Men's event was won by Justus Nieschlag, while Jess Learmonth won the women's race.

Men's results

Women's results

2021 season 
In 2021 the SLT Arena Games saw further expansion, with a second event in Rotterdam, held 18 April 2021, and an inaugural Arena Games London event, held 27 March 2021. The 2021 SLT Arena Games season was the second season of Arena Games racing to be held behind closed doors. Belgium's Marten Van Riel won both of the Men's events, while in the women's races Sophie Coldwell and Beth Potter, both of Great Britain, won the Rotterdam and London events respectively. The 2021 Arena Games season also featured paratriathlon racing.

Men's results

Women's results

Arena Games Triathlon Esport World Championship

Arena Games Triathlon Powered by Zwift 2023 
The 2023 Arena Games Triathlon season consisted of 3 events in Montreal, Sursee, and London. As with 2022, the winner of the 2023 Arena Games Triathlon series would be crowned Esports Triathlon World Champion. In 2023 Queen Elizabeth Olympic Park in London was the host venue for the series finale.
The line up for the 2023 Arena Games Triathlon Powered by Zwift series is as follows:
 February 25 2023: Montreal, Canada at Parc Olympique
 March 12 2023: Sursee, Switzerland at Campus Sursee  
 April 8/9 2023: London UK at London Aquatics Centre - Grand Finale

Arena Games Triathlon Powered by Zwift Montreal 
Arena Games Triathlon Powered by Zwift Montreal was held on Feb 25, 2023 at Montreal's Parc Olympique, the host venue for the 1976 Olympic Games. It marked the first time that an Arena Games Triathlon event had been held in North America. For the 2023 Arena Games Triathlon series all cycling (on Zwift) was to be done with non-drafting conditions. 

Notable names from the world of long distance triathlon, including Canadian athletes Lionel Sanders and Jackson Laundry, made their Arena Games racing debut at Montreal 2023, with Sanders setting a new all time Arena Games record for the bike section of the race (4km in 5:06). In the final, stand out swimmer, Chase McQueen of the USA was able to take the victory, closely followed by Olympic Bronze medallist and twice Commonwealth Champion Henri Schoeman - in what was his first major event podium after several years of injury setbacks. British newcomer Jack Stanton-Stock was the surprise package of the event, rounding off the podium in 3rd place. In the women's race, McQueen's partner Gina Sereno (also of the USA) took the win, ahead of Commonwealth Games Relay Medallist Sophie Linn of Australia, and Dominika Jamnicky of Canada.

Results

Men's Heat 1 Results

Men's Heat 2 Results

Women's Heat 1 Results

Women's Heat 2 Results

2022 Season & Inclusion of World Championship 
In November 2021, Super League Triathlon announced a new Championship Series, in partnership with World Triathlon. This series, known as Arena Games Triathlon Powered by Zwift would go on to crown the world's first Esports Triathlon World Champion, at the series final, in Singapore.

The line up for the 2022 Arena Games Triathlon Powered by Zwift series is as follows:

 April 9 2022: Munich, Germany at Olympia-Schwimmhalle
 April 23 2022: London, UK at London Aquatics Centre
 May 7 2022: Singapore Grand Final at Marina Bay, Singapore

2022 World Championship Final Standings

Men's results

Women's results

Arena Games Triathlon Powered by Zwift, Munich 
Arena Games Triathlon Powered by Zwift, Munich 2022 was held in Olympia-Schwimmhalle at Olympiapark, Munich, on 9th April 2022. The event consisted of heats and finals for both the male and the female athletes, with the top 3 athletes from each heat, plus the 2 fastest losers overall progressing to the final. 

In the Ladies Final, Beth Potter put on a dominant display, taking the win by over a minute after the disqualification of fellow frontrunner Petra Kurikova in the heats. German athletes Lena Meißner and Anabel Knoll completed the podium, in front of a home crowd. France's Aurelien Raphael took the Men's overall win, in a shock victory over highly favoured Alex Yee and Belgium's Marten Van Riel. Newcomer Max Stapley of Australia finished in second, while 2020 Rotterdam Champion and 2021 London Runner-up, Justus Nieschlag continued his strong tradition at Arena Games by completing the podium.

Results

Heats Results 
Women Heat 1

Women Heat 2

Men Heat 1

Men Heat 2

Finals Results 
Women Final

Men Final

Arena Games Triathlon Powered by Zwift London 
Arena Games Triathlon Powered by Zwift, London 2022 was held at Queen Elizabeth Olympic Park,  London on 23rd April 2022. As with Munich, event consisted of heats and finals for both the male and the female athletes, this time with the top 4 athletes from each heat, plus the 2 fastest losers overall progressing to the final. In a departure from previous Arena Games events, the drafting feature, on the Zwift platform, was deactivated for the event. Thus athletes could no longer gain an advantage by riding in a pack or with others within Zwift while racing.

In the Ladies Final, France's Cassandre Beaugrand set an Arena Games run record of 2:45/km on route to victory ahead of favourites Georgia Taylor Brown, Jess Learmonth, and Munich victor Beth Potter., German athlete Justus Nieschlag took the Men's overall win, in a shock victory over home favourite Alex Yee. Yee finished in second, while Arena Games debutant Nicolo Strada of Italy finished third. The victory made Nieschlag the most successful athlete in Arena Games history, with four podium finishes to his name. He had previously won the inaugural Arena Games in Rotterdam 2020, finished second at Arena Games London 2021, and finished in 3rd at the opening event of the 2022 Arena Games Triathlon series in Munich.

Results

Heats Results 
Women Heat 1

Women Heat 2

Men Heat 1

Men Heat 2

Finals Results 
Women Final

Men Final

Arena Games Triathlon Powered by Zwift Singapore 

The finale of the 2022 Arena Games Triathlon Powered by Zwift season was held in Singapore. Unlike previous iterations of Arena Games Triathlon, the swim for the Singapore event was held outdoors, in the iconic Marina Bay reservoir. It was the first sporting event to be held in the water of Marina Bay, making French Athlete Aurelien Raphael the first person to ever swim in Marina Bay.

The event consisted of Heats, Repechage Rounds, and a Final for both Men and Women. As well as the event victory, some athletes competing also stood a chance of being crowned the first ever Esports Triathlon World Champion, by winning the 2022 series overall.

Results

Heats Results

Women Heat 1 

Women Heat 2

Men Heat 1

Men Heat 2

Men Heat 3

Women's Repechage

Men's Repechage 1

Men's Repechage 2

Women's Final

Men's Final

References

External links
 
 International Triathlon Union (ITU)

Recurring sporting events established in 1989
Sports competition series